Yuraq Urqu (Quechua yuraq white, urqu mountain, "white mountain", also spelled Yuraccorcco) is a  mountain in the Andes of Peru. It is situated in the Arequipa Region, Condesuyos Province, Salamanca District, and in the La Unión Province, Puyca District. Yuraq Urqu lies northeast of a lake named Tintarqucha (Tintarcocha).

References 

Mountains of Peru
Mountains of Arequipa Region